Pincara is a comune (municipality) in the Province of Rovigo in the Italian region Veneto, located about  southwest of Venice and about  southwest of Rovigo.

The municipality of Pincara contains the frazioni (subdivisions, mainly villages and hamlets) Bernarda, Gambaro, Paolino, Romanato, and Roncala.

Pincara borders the following municipalities: Castelguglielmo, Fiesso Umbertiano, Frassinelle Polesine, Fratta Polesine, San Bellino, Villamarzana.

Demographic evolution

Twin towns
Pincara is twinned with:

  Smiltene Municipality, Latvia

References

Cities and towns in Veneto